Louisiana State Route 7 had multiple suffixed routes, designating bypassed alignments of the highway. They are listed below in order from west to east.

Elton (LA 7-D) 

Louisiana State Route 7-D (LA 7-D) spanned  from west to east and was known as Yoakum Street and Kennedy Road.  It served as the older alignment of LA 7 through Elton.

Junction list

Lawtell (LA 7-E) 

Louisiana State Route 7-E (LA 7-E) spanned  from west to east and was known as Summer Road.  It served as the older alignment of LA 7 near Lawtell.

Junction list

Opelousas (LA 7-H) 

Louisiana State Route 7-H (LA 7-H) spanned  from west to east.  It served as the older alignment of LA 7 near Opelousas.

Junction list

Krotz Springs (LA 7-D) 

Louisiana State Route 7-D (LA 7-D) spanned  from west to east.  It served as the older alignment of LA 7 east of Krotz Springs, being bypassed by a newer alignment through the Morganza Spillway. It last appeared on maps in 1944.

Junction list

Baton Rouge (LA 7-D) 

Louisiana State Route 7-D (LA 7-D) spanned  from west to east and was known as Old Hammond Highway.  It served as the older alignment of LA 7 through Baton Rouge, being bypassed by the newer Florida Boulevard project. The road is still known as Old Hammond Highway to this day.

Junction list

Denham Springs (LA 7-E) 

Louisiana State Route 7-E (LA 7-E) spanned  from west to east through the town of Denham Springs.  It served as the older alignment of LA 7.

Junction list

Walker (LA 7-F) 

Louisiana State Route 7-F (LA 7-F) spanned  from west to east through the town of Walker.  It served as the older alignment of LA 7.

Junction list

Albany to Hammond (LA 7-D) 

Louisiana State Route 7-E (LA 7-E) spanned  from west to east to connect LA 7 with the city of Hammond.  It served as the older alignment of LA 7 for the most part, with LA 366 picking up another old segment.

Junction list

Hammond to Robert (LA 7-E) 

Louisiana State Route 7-E (LA 7-E) spanned  from west to east from the town of Hammond to the community of Robert.  It served as the older alignment of LA 7.

Junction list

References
LADOTD Map of Numbered Highways
Louisiana State Highway Log
Google Earth

Former state highways in Louisiana